Aided by drought, a heat wave persisted in the late summer of 2000 along the southern tier of the United States from August to early September. On August 30, Memphis saw its second highest temperature of 107 degrees, just one degree short of its all time high of 108 degrees set in 1980. Damage totaled $4 billion, mainly due to wildfires and crop losses, and there were 140 deaths.

References

Southern United States Heat Wave, 2000
Southern United States Heat Wave, 2000
Heat waves in the United States